European Syriac Union is an alliance between different Assyrian/Syriac political and cultural organizations in Europe that was established in May 2004. The group emerged from the Bethnahrin National Council  or Mawtbo Umthoyo d'Bethnahrin (MUB), formerly known as the Bethnahrin Freedom Party (GHB) and Patriotic Revolutionary Organization of Bethnahrin (PROB) or Bethnahrin Patriotic Revolution Organization. Today, it is notable for operating Suroyo TV.

GHB history

GHB is a militant Assyrian/Syriac party, whose stated aim is to create an independent Assyrian state in Beth Nahrain, a reference to the Assyrian homeland. It is an ethnic secessionist organization that uses force and the threat of force against military targets for the purpose of achieving its political goal. The group has a youth wing as well dubbed "Free Youth of Bethnahrin".

Members
 Syrianska-Assyriska Riksförbundet i Sverige (Sweden)
 Renyo Hiro Magazine (Sweden)
 Union of the Syriac Associations in Switzerland
 Union of the Assyrian-Syriac Associations in Germany
 Bethnahrin Information Bureau in the Netherlands
 Institut Mésopotamie de Bruxelles
 Centre Culturel du Peuple de Mésopotamie in Belgium
 Assyrian-Syriac Culture Club of Vienna, Austria
 Assyrian-Chaldean-Syriac Union (ACSU)
 Union of the Free Women of Bethnahrin (HNHB)
 Union of the Youth of Mesopotamia (HCB)

See also
Iskender Alptekin
Dawronoye
Syriac Union Party (Syria)
Syriac Union Party (Lebanon)
Syriac Military Council
Sutoro

References

External links
Official website
Mihayel Cudi - A Biography 

Assyrian diaspora in Europe
Assyrian nationalism
Assyrian political parties
Dawronoye